Tore Milsett (born 23 April 1944) is a Norwegian cyclist. He was born in Lørenskog.

He competed at the 1968 Summer Olympics in Mexico City, where he placed fifth in team trial with the Norwegian team, which consisted of Thorleif Andresen, Ørnulf Andresen, Leif Yli and Milsett. He won the Norwegian National Road Race Championship in 1967 and 1968.

References

1944 births
Living people
Norwegian male cyclists
People from Lørenskog
Olympic cyclists of Norway
Cyclists at the 1968 Summer Olympics
Cyclists at the 1972 Summer Olympics
Sportspeople from Viken (county)